The Russian Pamir is a former territory of Imperial Russia, now the province of Gorno-Badakhshan of Tajikistan. The regional capital is Khorugh.

Subdivisions of the Russian Empire
Geographic history of Tajikistan
Historical regions in Russia